The discography of Colombian singer-songwriter Fonseca consists of four studio albums, two live albums, one compilation album, seventeen singles and fourteen music videos. In 2002, he was signed with Líderes Entertainment and released his eponymous debut studio album in February 2002, Fonseca.

Albums

Studio albums

Live albums

Compilation albums

Singles

Album appearances
The following songs are not singles and have not appeared on an album by Fonseca.

Music videos

References 
General

 
 

Specific

External links 

Fonseca (singer)
Discographies of Colombian artists
Latin pop music discographies
Tropical music discographies